"Karma" is a song performed by Finnish singer-songwriter Alma. The song was released in Finland as a digital download on 3 June 2016 as the lead single from her debut extended play Dye My Hair (2016). The song peaked at number five on the Finnish Singles Chart and number 100 on the Swedish Singles Chart.

Music video
A music video to accompany the release of "Karma" was first released onto YouTube on 1 July 2016 at a total length of three minutes and twenty-one seconds.

Track listing

Charts

Release history

References

2016 songs
2016 singles
Alma (Finnish singer) songs
Songs written by Jenson Vaughan
Songs written by Jeremy Chacon
Songs written by Alma (Finnish singer)
Virgin Records singles